{{DISPLAYTITLE:C21H29NO}}
The molecular formula C21H29NO (molar mass: 311.46 g/mol) may refer to:

 Alphamethadol
 Betamethadol
 Biperiden
 Dimepheptanol, or methadol
 Isomethadol
 UR-144

Molecular formulas